5 Tauri is a binary star in the zodiac constellation of Taurus, located approximately 530 light years from the Sun. It is visible to the naked eye as a faint orange-hued star with an apparent visual magnitude of +4.14. It is moving further from the Earth with a heliocentric radial velocity of +14 km/s.

This is a spectroscopic binary with a period of 960 days and an eccentricity of about 0.4. The primary component is a K-type giant with a stellar classification of K0-III. It has four times the mass of the Sun and is radiating 329 times the Sun's luminosity from its photosphere at an effective temperature of 4,644 K.

References

External links
 

K-type giants
Spectroscopic binaries
Taurus (constellation)
Tauri, f
Durchmusterung objects
Tauri, 005
021754
016369
1066